Howard Zell "Polly" McLarry (March 25, 1891 – November 4, 1971), was an American baseball player who played infielder in the Major Leagues from 1912 to 1915.  He played for the Chicago Cubs and Chicago White Sox.  During the 1912 season, McLarry played in 2 games with the Chicago White Sox, only saw one at bat per game, and failed to record a hit or reach base safely.  McLarry played in 68 games for the Chicago Cubs playing first and second base.

References

 

1891 births
1971 deaths
Major League Baseball infielders
Chicago Cubs players
Chicago White Sox players
Minor league baseball managers
Beeville Orange Growers players
Austin Senators players
Lincoln Railsplitters players
Topeka Jayhawks players
Louisville Colonels (minor league) players
Los Angeles Angels (minor league) players
Shreveport Gassers players
Vernon Tigers players
Binghamton Bingoes players
Memphis Chickasaws players
Des Moines Boosters players
Reading Keystones players
Nashville Vols players
Atlanta Crackers players
Meridian Mets players
Selma Cloverleafs players
People from Leonard, Texas